The following is a list of Netherlands women's national rugby union team international matches.

Overall 
The Netherlands overall international match record against all nations, updated to 16 October 2022, is as follows:

Full internationals

1980s

1990s

2000s

2010s

2020s

Other internationals

Notes

References 

Netherlands
Women's rugby union in the Netherlands